A Question of the Heart is a 2009 Italian comedy-drama film directed by Francesca Archibugi.

Cast 

Antonio Albanese: Alberto
Kim Rossi Stuart: Angelo
Micaela Ramazzotti: Rossana
Alessia Fugardi: Claudia
Francesca Inaudi: Carla
Andrea Calligari: Airton
Nelsi Xhemalaj: Perla
Chiara Noschese: Loredana
Paolo Villaggio: Renato
Stefania Sandrelli 
Carlo Verdone 
Ascanio Celestini 
 Daniele Luchetti
 Paolo Sorrentino
 Paolo Virzì

See also    
 List of Italian films of 2009

References

External links

2009 films
Italian comedy-drama films
Films directed by Francesca Archibugi
2009 comedy-drama films
2000s Italian-language films
2000s Italian films